Vincent Ségal (born 1967 in Reims, France) is a French cellist and bassist.

He studied at the National Music Academy of Lyon and the Banff Centre for the Arts in Canada. He is mainly known for the variety of his collaborations and unusual projects. He has worked with Steve Nieve, Elvis Costello, Cesaria Evora, Blackalicious, Carlinhos Brown, the French reggae band Tryo, Franck Monnet, the experimental project Mujeres Encinta, Georges Moustaki or with Alexandre Desplat in the O.S.T. of Lust, Caution and other of his films.

In 1986 he and Cyril Atef and formed the band Bumcello, a downtempo electronica duo that won the Victoires de la Musique award and was named Electronic artist of the year 2006. He played on every Matthieu Chedid (-M-) album. In 2009 he worked with Sting on his album If on a Winter's Night.... In October of the same year he recorded, in the studio of Salif Keïta in Mali, the album Chamber Music with Ballaké Sissoko

Discography

As leader
2002: T-Bone Guarnerius
2007: Cello

With Bumcello
 1999: Bumcello
 2001: Booty Time
 2002: Nude for Love
 2003: Get Me (live)
 2005: Animal sophistiqué
 2008: Lychee Queen
 2012: Al

Collaborations 
With Ballaké Sissoko
 2009: Chamber Music
 2015: Musique de Nuit

With -M-
 1997: Le Baptême
 1999: Je dis aime 
 2003: Qui de nous deux

With Mujeres Encinta
 1999: Wild Hongi (The Beak Brackets Series)  
 2001: Carisma de Alquiler 

With Dick Annegarn
 1999: Adieu verdure 
 2000: Au cirque d'hiver (label Tôt ou tard)

With Blackalicious
 2002: Blazing arrow
 2005: The Craft

With Piers Faccini
 2003: Leave No Trace
 2014: Songs of Time Lost 

With others
 1996: Olympic Gramofon with Olympic Gramofon
 1997: Cabo Verde by Cesaria Evora
 1997: AlphaGamabetiZado by Carlinhos Brown 
 2000: Bliss by Vanessa Paradis
 2002: Climax by Alain Bashung
 2003: Black Orpheus (Neptune) by Keziah Jones
 2003: Cruel Smile by Elvis Costello
 2004: Zenzile & Jamika meet Cello by Zenzile
 2004: Douze fois par an by Jeanne Cherhal
 2006: Libido by Brigitte Fontaine
 2006: Navega by Mayra Andrade
 2007: 33 1/3 by Susheela Raman
 2009: If on a Winter's Night... by Sting
 2010: Comme la rencontre fortuite... with Jean-Jacques Birgé
 2010: Révélations with Jean-Jacques Birgé
 2011: Dans tous ses états with Jean-Jacques Birgé and Antonin-Tri Hoang
 2013: Dans tous les sens du terme with Jean-Jacques Birgé and Antonin-Tri Hoang
 2013: Dépaysages Côté Court with Jean-Jacques Birgé, Antonin-Tri Hoang and Jacques Perconte
 2020: Pique-nique au labo by Jean-Jacques Birgé

References

External links 
 Vincent Ségal at discogs
 Vincent Ségal last.fm page
 Vincent Ségal at NPR
 Vincent Ségal's page at Label Bleu
 Bumcello's website

1967 births
French cellists
Musicians from Reims
Living people
Label Bleu artists
Naïve Records artists
Six Degrees Records artists